Khajawa and Son, Pakistani TV show (began in 1985) is a comedy serial that revolves around Khawaja Sahib (played by Ali Ejaz) and his son Jawad (played by Aurangzeb). It is directed by Ayub Khawar and written by Ata ul Haq Qasmi.

Plot
As a father, Khawaja Sahib is quick to catch on to any mistakes or wrong steps his son takes and is ever ready to correct him. His major correction tool is twisting the ears of his son, who is a full grown adult. With his father not giving him much room to breathe and his nine sisters continuously placing demands on him, there is not much fun out there for Jawad. His loss is the TV viewer's gain as the products of these interactions, the comical scenes and situations, are a treat to watch. This drama series provides a comic relief while talking about social issues in Pakistani society.

This TV comedy drama is for those who appreciate the value of principles, family values, and respect for elders, and above all have an insatiable appetite for fun and humor. Khawaja and Son makes for light viewing, isn't taxing on the brain and therefore can be viewed over and over again.

Ali Ejaz's comical role as Khawaja Sahib is a revelation. His dialogue delivery is quite exceptional, especially when he suddenly switches to speaking in English (broken and forced); this is a source of much amusement for the viewers. The TV series director Ayub Khawar is quite skillful in doing his job and is highly rated among the TV directors of Pakistan.

Cast
 Ali Ejaz as Khawaja Sahib (plays the father's role)
 Aurangzeb as Jawad (plays the son's role)
 Ghayyur Akhtar as Javed
 Arifa Siddiqui as Samina
 Samina Khalid as Nabeela
 Shaista Jabeen as Rubina
 Ismat Tahira as Rabia
 Najma Begum as Ruqayya
 Iram Kanwal as Yasmeen
 Fakhri Ahmed as Chaudhry A.W
 Fauzia Rehman as Aasia
 Huma Hameed as Khalda
 Jazba Sultan as Razia
 Khayyam Sarhadi as Khalda's husband
 Muhammad Sharif as Udas
 Salma Khan as Nabeela's Mother
 Akhtar Shad as Doctor Anwar
 Shama Chaudhry as Zahid's Mother
 Tauqeer Nisar as Zahid
 Zahir Khan as Rafiq
 Tajammal Hussain as Raqayya's Husband

References

External links
 Watch 'Khawaja and Son on YouTube

1980s Pakistani television series
Television shows set in Lahore
Pakistani television sitcoms